Jack Mann (born 17 November 1999 in Scotland) is a Scottish rugby union player. He plays as a Number 8 for Glasgow Warriors.

Rugby Union career

Amateur career

He played for Edinburgh Academicals.

Professional career

He was given a place in the Scottish Rugby Academy for the 2019-20 season and assigned to Edinburgh Rugby, alongside Heriots.

Mann played for Heriots in the Super 6.

After impressing for the Super 6 side, he was selected to train with Glasgow Warriors. He made his competitive debut for the Glasgow side in the European Challenge Cup against Bath Rugby on 10 December 2022. He became Glasgow Warrior No. 349.

International career

He played for Scotland U20.

References

1999 births
Living people
Rugby union flankers
Rugby union number eights
Glasgow Warriors players
Heriot's RC players
Edinburgh Academicals rugby union players
Edinburgh Rugby players